Strandheem '92 is an EP by Seirom, independently released on July 2, 2014.

Track listing

Personnel
Adapted from the Strandheem '92 liner notes.
 Maurice de Jong (as Mories) – vocals, instruments, recording, cover art

Release history

References

External links 
 
 Strandheem '92 at Bandcamp

2014 EPs
Seirom albums